Charles Campbell (1854 – April 1927) was a Scottish footballer of the 1870s and 1880s who played for, and captained, Queen's Park and the Scotland national team.

A former pupil of the Edinburgh Academy, Campbell joined Queen's Park, Scotland's oldest football club, in 1870. He won eight Scottish Cup winner's medals with the club and was runner-up in the 1884 and 1885 FA Cup finals.  He sometimes played under the pseudonym "C. Elliott", including in major finals. He was also a member of the famous English amateur side Corinthians.

Campbell earned 13 caps for Scotland between 1874 and 1886, captaining them on nine occasions. He scored his only Scotland goal in a 2–0 win over Wales in March 1877 and lost only one match while playing for his country.

A keen orator, Campbell was also an important football bureaucrat, serving on the Queen's Park committee between 1874 and 1890 and holding the position of club president in 1879–80. He was elected president of the Scottish Football Association for the 1889–90 season. Campbell also served as match official for the 1889 Scottish Cup Final.

Campbell later moved to Ireland, where he had strong family connections and had spent much of his childhood, and died there in 1927. He was posthumously inducted into the Scottish Football Hall of Fame in 2005.

Career statistics

International

International goals
Scores and results list Scotland's goal tally first.

See also
List of Scotland national football team captains

References

External links

1854 births
1927 deaths
Scottish footballers
Scotland international footballers
Queen's Park F.C. players
Corinthian F.C. players
Footballers from Perth and Kinross
Scottish Football Hall of Fame inductees
Association football wing halves
People educated at Edinburgh Academy
Date of death missing
FA Cup Final players